Anthony J. Farquhar D.D., S.T.L., B.A. (born 6 September 1940) is the Catholic emeritus Auxiliary Bishop of the Diocese of Down and Connor.

Early life and ministry
Anthony Farquhar was born and raised in South Belfast, Northern Ireland and educated at St. Malachy's College. He later studied classics at Queen's University, Belfast. He was then sent to study theology at the Pontifical Lateran University, Rome. He was ordained to the priesthood on 13 March 1965, aged 24.

Farquhar was assistant priest at Dunsford and Ardglass Parish. He was a hospital chaplain in 1966. He was later assigned to teach Latin at St MacNissi's College, Garron Tower, where he stayed as a teacher from 1966 to 1970. From 1970 to 1975 he was assistant chaplain, along with Ambrose Macaulay, to Queen's University, Belfast and finally as Chaplain/Lecturer at the University of Ulster from 1975 to 1983.

Farquhar's main outside interests are folk music and football, particularly student football. He is president of Queen's University Belfast A.F.C. and also serves as patron of the Irish Universities Football Union.

Bishop
On 6 April 1983, aged 42, Farquhar was appointed Titular Bishop of Hermiana and, with Patrick Walsh, as Auxiliary Bishop of Down & Connor. The principal consecrator was the Bishop of Down and Connor, Cahal Daly, (later Cardinal Archbishop of the Archdiocese of Armagh) and principal co-consecrators were Archbishop Gaetano Alibrandi, the Apostolic Nuncio to Ireland and William J. Philbin (Bishop Emeritus of Down and Connor). During the ordination ceremony, the assistant Priests to Bishop Farquhar were his priest uncles, Canon Walter Larkin and Fr. Thomas Aquinas Larkin O.C.D.

His episcopal motto is 'Sapientia Proficere' ('to increase in wisdom') from Luke 2:52. He took an active and ongoing interest in interchurch relations and served as Chairman of the Irish Bishops Conference on Ecumenism.

Farquhar travelled to Rome for their Quinquennial Visit Ad Limina visit in October 2006.

In December 2007 he officiated at the dedication of the new altar in the Church of the Good Shepherd in his native parish of the Most Holy Rosary, Belfast, following the renovation programme.

A book titled Inter-Church Relations: Developments and Perspectives, published by Veritas to mark the 25th anniversary of Farquhar's ordination as a bishop contained contributions by a number of people praising Farquhar's work. Seán Brady noted he was “engaged actively in promoting bonds of friendship and understanding at times when it has been far from easy to do so”.

Retirement
On December 3, 2015 Pope Francis accepted Farquhar's resignation on the grounds of age. He was at that time the longest serving bishop in Ireland.

References

External links

Diocese of Down & Connor
Anthony Farquhar biodata at Catholic Hierarchy website

1940 births
Living people
Clergy from Belfast
Alumni of Queen's University Belfast
20th-century Roman Catholic bishops in Northern Ireland
Association football people in Northern Ireland